Charlie Daniels (born December 7, 1939) is an American Democratic Party politician from Arkansas. He was the State Auditor of Arkansas from 2011 to 2015 and previously served as Arkansas Secretary of State, and as Commissioner of State Lands.

Early life and education
Charlie Daniels was born in the Union County, Arkansas community of Parkers Chapel, and grew up in El Dorado, Arkansas. He served in the United States Air Force and the Air Force Reserve. Daniels attended Southern Arkansas University, and the University of Arkansas at Little Rock. He began his political career as a member of the Parker's Chapel school board from 1972 to 1974. From 1974 to 1980, he served as Director of the Arkansas Department of Labor in the Cabinet of Governor David Pryor until 1979, and was retained in that post for another year under Governor Bill Clinton. He served as director of government affairs for the Arkansas Electric Cooperative Corporation from 1980 to 1984.

Political career
In 1984, he was elected as Arkansas Commissioner of State Lands, and was subsequently re-elected to four-year terms in 1986, 1990, 1994, and 1998. He was elected as the 32nd Arkansas Secretary of State in 2002, defeating the Republican Party nominee, Janet Huckabee, the wife of then-Governor Mike Huckabee, and was re-elected in 2006.

In 2010, he ran for State Auditor, opposed only by Green Party candidate Mary Hughes-Willis. He won the election and took office in January 2011.

Daniels announced in 2013 that he would not seek re-election in the 2014 elections. Hoping to succeed him were Republican State Representative Andrea Lea, Democrat Regina Stewart Hampton and Libertarian Brian Leach. Lea won the election and took office as the next State Auditor in January 2015.

Personal life
A widower, he was married to Patricia Ann Burleson Daniels for 46 years. He has two children, four grandsons, two granddaughters and one great-grandson.

References

Notes
 Arkansas State Auditor Biography 
 Project Vote Smart Profile

1939 births
Living people
State Auditors of Arkansas
Secretaries of State of Arkansas
State cabinet secretaries of Arkansas
Arkansas Democrats
People from Union County, Arkansas
People from Bryant, Arkansas
University of Arkansas at Little Rock alumni
Southern Arkansas University alumni